The  was a field army of the Imperial Japanese Army during World War II.

The Japanese 11th Area Army was formed on February 6, 1945 under the Imperial General Headquarters and transferred to the control of the Japanese First General Army on April 8, 1945. The Japanese 11th Area Army was responsible for the Tōhoku region of Japan and was headquartered in Sendai, Miyagi.

It consisted mostly of poorly trained reservists, conscripted students and home guard militia. In addition, the Japanese had organized the Volunteer Fighting Corps — which included all healthy men aged 15 to 60 and women 17 to 40 — to perform combat support, and ultimately combat jobs. Weapons, training, and uniforms were generally lacking: some men were armed with nothing better than muzzle-loading muskets, longbows, or bamboo spears; nevertheless, they were expected to make do with what they had.

The 11th Area Army was demobilized at the surrender of Japan on August 15, 1945 without having seen combat.

List of commanders

Commanding officer

Chief of staff

References

Books

External links

Notes 

11
Military units and formations established in 1945
Military units and formations disestablished in 1945